Steve Mullings (born 28 November 1982) is a Jamaican former sprint athlete who specialized in the 100 and 200 metres events and in 2011 was given a lifetime ban for doping.

Mullings began his international athletics career with a bronze medal win in the 100 m at the Pan American Junior Championships. At the 2004 national championship he made his first impact in senior athletics, setting new bests of 10.04 and 20.22 in the sprints, and finishing as the 200 m national champion. This earned him qualification into the 2004 Summer Olympics, but he was withdrawn from the competition after his sample from the national championships tested positive for banned substances. After his B sample also tested positive for testosterone, he was banned from competition for two years and his results between mid-2004 and 2005 were removed from the record.

He returned to competition in 2006 but finished the season with unimpressive bests of 10.31 and 20.54. The following year was much more successful. He won the 100 m in Zaragoza with a wind-aided (3.7 m/s) run of 9.91 seconds, and featured on the 2007 IAAF Golden League circuit. He competed at the 2007 World Championships in Athletics as a heats runner for the Jamaican silver medal-winning 4×100 metres relay team.

After an uneventful 2008, Mullings returned to form in 2009. He placed second over 200 metres in the national championships behind Olympic champion Usain Bolt. He set new personal bests in both sprints in July, running 20.01 seconds over 200 m in Rethymno, and 10.01 seconds over 100 m at the Golden Gala. Competing at the 2009 World championships in Berlin, Mullings finished 5th behind Bolt in the 200m in a personal best time of 19.98 seconds and won his first global gold medal as part of the successful Jamaican 4×100 metres relay team, running in both heats and the final.

In 2011, he broke the 10 second barrier for the first time at age 28, and by the end of the year had run under 10 seconds seven times.

However, on 11 August 2011, it was reported that Mullings had tested positive for the drug Furosemide, a masking agent. The positive test was recorded at the Jamaican national trials in June where he finished third in the men's 100-metre final.
On 22 November the Jamaican Anti-Doping Disciplinary Panel handed him a lifetime ban from athletics. They voted unanimously on the decision.

Personal bests

All information taken from IAAF profile.

References

External links

Interview with Phil Minshull from 2007.

1982 births
Living people
People from Saint Elizabeth Parish
Jamaican male sprinters
Jamaican sportspeople in doping cases
Doping cases in athletics
World Athletics Championships medalists
World Athletics Championships winners
Sportspeople banned for life